Tribby Peak is a peak  west of Mount Bubier on Edwards Peninsula, Thurston Island. It was named by the Advisory Committee on Antarctic Names (US-ACAN) after Osborne M. Tribby, the Pharmacist's Mate in the Eastern Group of U.S. Navy Operation Highjump and an aircrewman on the PBM Mariner flight to Noville Peninsula on January 11–12, 1947, in which survivors of the December 30 PBM crash were rescued and returned to the seaplane tender Pine Island.

Maps
 Thurston Island – Jones Mountains. 1:500000 Antarctica Sketch Map. US Geological Survey, 1967.
 Antarctic Digital Database (ADD). Scale 1:250000 topographic map of Antarctica. Scientific Committee on Antarctic Research (SCAR). Since 1993, regularly upgraded and updated.

Mountains of Ellsworth Land
Thurston Island